Yossi Katz (born 19 August 1949) is an Israeli former politician who served as a member of the Knesset for the Labor Party and One Israel between 1992 and 2003.

Biography
Born in Haifa, Katz studied law at the Hebrew University of Jerusalem, gaining an LLB and LLM, before working as a lawyer. He became the Histadrut's legal advisor in the Haifa area, and was a member of the union's committee for labour legislation. He also served on Kiryat Tiv'on's local council.

In 1992 he was elected to the Knesset on the Labor Party list, and was appointed chairman of the Labor and Welfare Committee. He was re-elected in 1996, after which he chaired the State Control committee. After being re-elected for a second time in 1999 (this time as the 25th-placed candidate on the One Israel alliance list), he chaired the House Committee, as well as the Special Legislative Committee for Not Renewing the Emergency Situation and the Special Committee for Discussion of the Security Service Law. During his time in the Knesset he was also an observer on the Council of Europe.

Katz lost his seat in the 2003 elections.

References

External links

1949 births
People from Haifa
Hebrew University of Jerusalem Faculty of Law alumni
Israeli lawyers
Israeli trade unionists
Living people
One Israel politicians
Israeli Labor Party politicians
People from Kiryat Tiv'on
Members of the 13th Knesset (1992–1996)
Members of the 14th Knesset (1996–1999)
Members of the 15th Knesset (1999–2003)